HerningCentret is a shopping mall in Herning, Denmark, by Herningmotorvejen and Midtjyske Highway. The Centre opened in 1978 and now contains 60 shops. It is the largest center in the Central Region. The Centre has, among other things, Kvickly Xtra and Jensen's Bøfhus. HerningCentret grew by 20 stores in 2009.

External links 
 Herningcenteret's Website  

Shopping centres in Denmark
Tourist attractions in the Central Denmark Region
Buildings and structures in Herning Municipality
Herning